Michelle Kalivati (née Hadfield) is a New Zealand Paralympian who competed in athletics. At the 1984 Summer Paralympics, she won gold medals in the 200m 3 and Pentathlon 3, and silver medals in the 100m 3 and Slalom 3.

References

External links 
 
 

Living people
Year of birth missing (living people)
Paralympic athletes of New Zealand
Athletes (track and field) at the 1984 Summer Paralympics
Paralympic gold medalists for New Zealand
Paralympic silver medalists for New Zealand
Medalists at the 1984 Summer Paralympics
Paralympic medalists in athletics (track and field)
New Zealand wheelchair racers